Cotton Ground is a town on the island of Nevis in Saint Kitts and Nevis. It is the capital of Saint Thomas Lowland Parish.

Populated places in Saint Kitts and Nevis
Saint Thomas Lowland Parish